Antimima quartzitica is a species of plant in the family Aizoaceae. It is endemic to Namibia.  Its natural habitat is rocky areas. It is threatened by habitat loss.

References

Flora of Namibia
quartzitica
Least concern plants
Taxonomy articles created by Polbot